The Little Vermilion River is a  tributary of the Wabash River. The Little Vermilion rises in southern Vermilion County, Illinois, flowing eastward past Georgetown, Illinois, into Vermillion County, Indiana, where it joins the Wabash near Newport.

There is a second river in Illinois that bears the same name: the Little Vermilion River (Illinois River tributary).

The Little Vermilion drains a small portion of northern Edgar County, Illinois. The watershed also extends into Champaign County, Illinois, via drainage ditches.

See also
List of Illinois rivers
List of Indiana rivers

References

External links
Prairie Rivers Network
TMDLs for the Little Vermilion (PDF)
TopoQuest Newport, Indiana

Rivers of Illinois
Rivers of Indiana
Tributaries of the Wabash River
Rivers of Vermillion County, Indiana
Rivers of Vermilion County, Illinois
Rivers of Edgar County, Illinois